Schinzel is a German language metonymic occupational surname for a weaver and may refer to:
Andrzej Schinzel (1937–2021), Polish mathematician
Britta Schinzel (1943), German mathematician
Dieter Schinzel (1942), German politician
Silvia Schinzel (1958), Austrian sprinter
Władysław Schinzel (1943), Polish chess player

References 

German-language surnames
Occupational surnames